The Sanxian Cave, or Sanxian Dong, literally meaning 'Three Fairies Cave', is a limestone cave located in Sanjiaoyan Village, Mengga Town, Mangshi City, Yunnan Province. The folklore says that the Cave was named after the three immortals who discovered it and lived in it for a long time. 

The Sanxian Cave was formed in the Late Permian, more than 2.7 million years ago. There are stalagmites, stalactites, stone pillars, stone mantles, stone flowers and other landscapes distributed in the cave.

References

Geography of Yunnan
Limestone caves